"Ordinary People is a song written by Ed Hill and Craig Wiseman, and recorded by American country music singer Clay Walker.  It was released in May 1998 as the first single from his Greatest Hits compilation album.

The song is Walker's sixteenth single release, as well as his sixteenth Top forty hit on the Billboard country singles charts. However, it was his lowest charting single at the time of its release as well as his first single to miss the top twenty.

Content
The song describes how "ordinary people have extraordinary love." The narrator compares ordinary people to famous people.

Critical reception
Larry Flick of Billboard gave the song a positive rating "Cynics might be quick too dismiss the lyrics as being to syrupy. However, it's a sentiment that country music's core audience can relate to. Walker teams with James Stroud for production that is understated, while Walker turns in a plaintive, heartfelt performance."

Chart positions
"Ordinary People" is Walker's sixteenth Top 40 single on the Billboard country singles charts. The song spent nineteen weeks on the charts, peaking at number 35 on the chart week of July 4. It also peaked at number 22 on the RPM Country Tracks charts in Canada.

Charts

References

1998 singles
1998 songs
Clay Walker songs
Songs written by Craig Wiseman
Song recordings produced by James Stroud
Giant Records (Warner) singles
Songs written by Ed Hill